Glossa: A Journal of General Linguistics is a peer-reviewed open access academic journal covering general linguistics. It was established in 2016. The journal is published by the Open Library of Humanities and the editor-in-chief is Johan Rooryck (Leiden University).

History
In October 2015, the editors and editorial board of Lingua resigned en masse to protest their inability to come to an agreement with Elsevier regarding fair pricing models for open access publishing. They subsequently started a new journal, while Elsevier continued publishing Lingua with new editors and a new editorial board. The original editorial board of Lingua was supported in their protest by the Association of Public and Land-grant Universities, the Association of Research Libraries, the American Association of State Colleges and Universities, the American Council on Education, the Canadian Association of Research Libraries, the Confederation of Open Access Repositories, Educause, and the Scholarly Publishing and Academic Resources Coalition.
In 2016, the journal was hosted by Ubiquity Press and funded by the Vereniging van Universiteiten and the Dutch Research Council. In 2021, the journal switched for the Open Library of Humanities.

Abstracting and indexing
The journal is abstracted and indexed in:

According to the Journal Citation Reports, the journal has a 2021 impact factor of 1.063.

References

External links
 

Linguistics journals
Creative Commons Attribution-licensed journals
English-language journals
Continuous journals
Publications established in 2016